Carolyn "Bunny" Welsh of Chadds Ford, Pennsylvania is the former Sheriff of Chester County, Pennsylvania. She held the position from 2000 to 2020. On November 24, 2020, she was arraigned on theft and diversion of services charges along with Harry McKinney, her boyfriend, who served under her as a lieutenant during her 20-year tenure. Welsh was accused of stealing $67,000 through illegal diversions of funds to her boyfriend.  Welsh pled no contest to the theft charges.

Early life 
Welsh attended Wesley College, and the Wharton School of the University of Pennsylvania. She is a former president of the Rotary Club Concordville-Chadds Ford and is a member of the Chester County Chamber of Business and Industry.

Law enforcement career 
Welsh is the first woman to be elected Sheriff of Chester County. She is also the first woman to be elected president of a class at the National Sheriffs Institute at the Department of Corrections in Longmont, Colorado.

References

External links 
 Sheriff: Carolyn Bunny Welsh Chester County Sheriff's Office

Living people
Women sheriffs
Pennsylvania sheriffs
Women in Pennsylvania politics
American women police officers
Pennsylvania Republicans
2016 United States presidential electors
21st-century American women politicians
21st-century American politicians
People from Chadds Ford Township, Pennsylvania
1943 births